The 2018 NASCAR Whelen Euro Series is the tenth Racecar Euro Series season, and the sixth under the NASCAR Whelen Euro Series branding. The season consisted of six meetings – with two races at each meeting – starting on 14 April at Circuit Ricardo Tormo in Valencia, and ending on 21 October at Circuit Zolder in Belgium. Alon Day and Thomas Ferrando entered the season as the defending champion in Elite 1 and Elite 2 respectively.

In the Elite 1 class, Alon Day successfully defended his Elite 1 title, winning the championship by 28 points over Frédéric Gabillon. In the Elite 2 class, Ulysse Delsaux scored his first NASCAR Euro Series title, ahead of Go Fas Racing's Florian Venturi by six points. RDV Compétition won the team's championship title, while Toyota won their first Euro Series manufacturer's title.

Teams and drivers

NASCAR released the entry list for the teams participating on 15 March 2018.

Elite 1 Division

Elite 2 Division

Driver changes
 Romain Iannetta will return to the series after a two-year absence, with him joining Go Fas Racing as their Elite 1 driver for this season.
 French F4 Championship driver Florian Venturi will make his debut in the series, joining Go Fas Racing as their Elite 2 driver for this season.
 Felipe Rabello switches team from CAAL Racing to PK Carsport, replacing Justin Kunz who switched to competing in both divisions with Racing Total. 
 Maciej Dreszer switches team from DF1 Racing to CAAL Racing. In addition, German driver Matthias Hauer will make his series debut, replacing Swedish driver Freddy Nordström as the Elite 1 driver of the No. 44 car.
 Truck Series driver Jennifer Jo Cobb will make her debut in the series, with her driving the No. 10 car of Racing Total.
 Both Loris Hezemans and Diederik Ceyssens will make their series debut driving the No. 50 Hendriks Motorsport Ford Mustang, driving in Elite 1 and Elite 2 respectively.
 Swiss drivers Mauro Trione and Francesco Parli will make their series debut driving the No. 31 Race Art Technology Ford Mustang, driving in Elite 1 and Elite 2 respectively.
 Lucas Lasserre will make his full-time debut in the series after participating part-time last season with Mishumotors. His teammates Eric Quintal and Advait Deodhar will also make their series debut, with Quintal driving in Elite 2 and Deodhar driving in Elite Club division.
 Former pro cyclist Tom Boonen and fellow Belgian Pedro Bonnet signed with Braxx Racing, with both making their series debut. Pedro Bonnet will drive the team's No. 90 car, while Boonen will drive the team's No. 91 car alongside Marc Goossens, who got transferred from the No. 90 car to the No. 91 car for this season.
 Monster Energy NASCAR Cup Series champion Bobby Labonte will make his full-time debut in the series, following his debut at Brands Hatch in 2017, driving the No. 18 RDV Compétition Toyota Camry in Elite 1.

Team changes
 For the first time in the team's history, Braxx Racing will field an Elite 2 driver other than Jerry de Weerdt. Former pro cyclist Tom Boonen and fellow Belgian Pedro Bonnet signed with the team to drive in Elite 2. Braxx also expands into a three-car team with the addition of the No. 91 car into the team, with the No. 91 car fielding the new Camaro chassis instead of the Mustang chassis.
 Hendriks Motorsport (not to be confused with Hendrick Motorsports that currently competes in the Monster Energy NASCAR Cup Series) supported Team Raceway Venray during the 2016 season but will now enter under their own name. The car is owned by Loris' father, former touring car racer Toine Hezemans.
 Solaris Motorsports will enter the season with Francesco Sini after racing mainly GT3 machinery in previous years.
 Go Fas Racing will expand to NASCAR Whelen Euro Series. This will make Go Fas the first team that competed in any of NASCAR's top three series to enter a car in the NASCAR Whelen Euro Series. Romain Iannetta will be the team's Elite 1 driver, while Florian Venturi will be the team's Elite 2 driver.
 Mishumotors will downsize from a two-car team into a single car team.
 Racers Motorsport also downsizes from a three-car team into a two-car team after previously listing a three-car squad to enter this season.
 Racing Total will make their NASCAR Euro Series full-season debut after previously competed in three races last season. They will also expand into a two-car team with the part-time No. 10 car.
 MRT by Nocentini returns to the series full-time, their first since 2016 as Double T by MRT Nocentini. They will also expand into a two-team effort following a one car part-time effort last season, with MRT fielding cars No. 40 (later renumbered as the No. 47 car) and No. 58 for this season.
 The Club Motorsports is expected to make their first full-season effort in the NASCAR Whelen Euro Series after participating part-time in the 2017 season.
 Pegasus Racing switches from endurance racing to NASCAR Whelen Euro Series starting from this season. 
 BVR Motorsport and Race Art Technology are expected to make their debut in the series, both participating full-time fielding one car each for this season.
 Memphis Racing will make their debut in the series as a late addition to the entry list. They will field the No. 77 Chevrolet for this season.

Manufacturer changes
 NASCAR Whelen Euro Series will update their Chevrolet body style into a Camaro ZL1-based body style, in line with the move made by Chevrolet in Monster Energy NASCAR Cup Series that also introduces a Chevrolet Camaro ZL1 body style replacing the Chevrolet SS body style that have been used since the inception of the Generation 6 body style in 2013. Despite this, due to lack of available parts, all Chevrolet teams were using the Chevrolet SS body in Valencia and Franciacorta.
 BFGoodrich will become the series sole tyre supplier. The 100% Michelin subsidiary takes over from the parent company which supplied tyres for the series since its inception in 2009.

Mid-season team changes
 The Camaro body debuted at Franciacorta after the #91 Braxx Racing team made a switch to a Camaro body between Race 1 and Race 2 of the race weekend, with their Elite 2 driver Tom Boonen would become the first driver to use the new Camaro body in a NWES race (previously Chevrolet teams used a SS body similar to the body used in the Monster Energy NASCAR Cup Series from 2013 to 2017). As the season goes by, fellow Chevrolet teams PK Carsport, DF1 Racing, and Memphis Racing would also switched to the Camaro chassis.
 Three Ford teams, Solaris Motorsport, The Club Motorsports, and Race Art - Blu Mot, switched manufacturers to Chevrolet after the Camaro chassis became available for use. Later on, fellow Ford team Braxx Racing's No. 90 team would also made the switch to Chevrolet Camaro chassis.
 CAAL Motorsport and Racing Total's No. 46 team switched manufacturers mid-season, switching to Toyota and Ford respectively.
 Belgium Driver Academy made its debut at Franciacorta, running the #7 car for Martin Doubek and Maxime Pampel, both previously driving the #5 Renauer Motorsport Ford Mustang at Valencia. The team also replaces Renauer Motorsport, who shut down its operations after the Valencia round.
 After competing the first two races of the season, MRT by Nocentini withdrawn their entries for the rest of the season, although the team made a return for the Hockenheim round with Renzo Calcinati behind the wheel of the No. 47 car.
 Pegasus Racing also withdrawn their entries for the rest of the season after their only car was written out following a heavy accident in Brands Hatch.
 After the fourth round in Tours, BVR Motorsports and Hendriks Motorsport would withdrawn their Elite 1 and Elite 2 entries respectively for the rest of the season.
 RDV Compétition's third entry, the No. 51 Ford Mustang driven Didier Bec and Hugo Bec, made a return for a part-time effort, competing in Brands Hatch and Hockenheim. They would also later field the No. 04 Toyota Camry for NASCAR Pinty's Series driver Jean-François Dumoulin at Zolder as part of a driver exchange program that the Euro Series ran in conjunction with Pinty's Series.
 Alex Caffi Motorsport's No. 1 team would switch manufacturers to Toyota starting from Hockenheim.
 Mishumotors, who had previously downsized from a two-car team into a single car team, would expand into a two-car team once again when the team revived the No. 70 entry starting at Hockenheim.

Schedule and results

Elite 1

Elite 2

Season report
In the Elite 1 class, the championship was closely contested by defending champion Alon Day of CAAL Racing and Frédéric Gabillon of RDV Compétition. 
Day initially got the upper hand after winning the first three races of the season, but his championship campaign received a setback when he got disqualified at the second race in Franciacorta due to technical infringements during post-race inspection. Gabillon took the championship lead soon after and would lead the championship by the time the playoffs begin at Hockenheim. Problems for both Gabillon and Day at Hockenheim, however, allowed Lucas Lasserre of Mishumotors and rookie Loris Hezemans of Hendriks Motorsport to close up the gap, setting up a four-way battle for the title at Zolder. Ultimately, retirements for both Lasserre and Hezemans during the first race of the Zolder race meet effectively eliminated them from title contention, and with Gabillon unable to match Day's pace for the weekend, Alon Day was crowned champion after winning his seventh race of the season at the final race of the season. Alon Day's seven race wins set a new record for the most races won in a single Elite 1 Euro Series season, one short of Stienes Longin's overall record of 8 wins in the 2016 Elite 2 season. Gabillon won two races (Brands Hatch 1 and Tours 1), while Lassere (Franciacorta 2), Hezemans (Hockenheim 1), and 2015 Elite 2 champion Gianmarco Ercoli (Brands Hatch 2) scored one race win each.

In the Elite 2 class, the championship was closely fought between four drivers: Ulysse Delsaux of RDV Compétition, defending champions Wilfried Boucenna of Knauf 
Racing, Florian Venturi of Go Fas Racing, and the returning Guillaume Deflandre for Memphis Racing. Boucenna initially took the championship lead after sweeping both races at Valencia. However, problems for Boucenna at Franciacorta Race 2 allowed Deflandre to caught up to him, and further problems for Boucenna at the first race of Brands Hatch race meet allowed Deflandre to take the championship lead. Delsaux then sweeps the Tours race week to take the lead in the championship, and looks set to sweep the Hockenheim race week had a tire failure in the second race at Hockenheim didn't force him to retire from the race. This allowed Deflandre, Boucenna, and a resurgent Venturi to set up a four-way battle for the championship. A costly retirement at race 1 of Zolder ultimately took out Deflandre of the championship hunt, and while Venturi was able to score a win and a second-place finish at Zolder, Delsaux had enough gap between him and Venturi to take the championship with a third-place finish at the final race of the season. Delsaux also scored the most race wins of the season with three (Tours sweep and Hockenheim 1). Venturi (Brands Hatch 2 and Zolder 1), Boucenna (Valencia sweep), Deflandre (Brands Hatch 1 and Hockenheim 2), and PK Carsport's Guillaume Dumarey (Franciacorta 2 and Zolder 2) scored two race wins, while Brazilian Felipe Rabello (Franciacorta 1) scored one race win.

In the team's championship, with both of their drivers being in the championship hunt for the entirety of the season, RDV Compétition's #3 team comfortably won team's title, finishing 107 points clear of Knauf Racing's #37 team. New teams Memphis Racing and Go Fas Racing scored an impressive third and fourth-place finish, while Knauf Racing's #73 team completes the top five in the team's championship.

In the manufacturer's championship, Toyota claimed their first Euro Series manufacturers title, becoming the first manufacturer to successfully topple Chevrolet from the top spot. Toyota's championship hopes were helped by the decision made by Alon Day's team CAAL Racing to switch manufacturers from Chevrolet to Toyota mid-season, giving Toyota the crucial edge they need to secure the manufacturer's title.

Notably, this season saw a noticeable increase in attention from the other side of the Atlantic. Both former Monster Energy NASCAR Cup Series champion Bobby Labonte and current Monster Energy NASCAR Cup Series team Go Fas Racing made their Euro Series debuts in 2018. Labonte, in his first season as a full-time driver since 2011, scored a second-place finish at the second race in Tours (the only oval race meet in the schedule) and would finish 14th in the standings with 1 Top 5 and 3 Top 10 finishes. Go Fas impressed in their debut season, finishing fourth in the team's championship with their Elite 2 driver Florian Venturi being in the championship hunt for much of the season. Truck Series regular Jennifer Jo Cobb also made an appearance at Valencia, driving for Racing Total in the Elite 2 class, a decision that ultimately allowed Racing Total driver Justin Kunz to make a Truck Series start for Jo Cobb's Truck team in Mosport. Pinty's Series driver Jean-François Dumoulin and K&N East driver Dale Quarterley made an appearance at Zolder as part of a driver exchange program that the Euro Series ran in conjunction with Pinty's Series and K&N East. Former B. J. McLeod Motorsports driver Stephen Young also made an appearance this season, driving for Racing Total's #10 entry at Tours in the Elite 2 class.

Standings

Points are awarded to drivers and team using the current point system used in Monster Energy NASCAR Cup Series, NASCAR Xfinity Series, and NASCAR Camping World Truck Series, excluding the Stage and Race Winner bonus points. For the final two races in Hockenheim and Zolder, double points are awarded. In addition, the driver that gained the most positions in a race will receive bonus championship points.

Elite 1
(key) Bold - Pole position awarded by fastest qualifying time (in Race 1) or by previous race's fastest lap (in Race 2) or by setting the fastest lap time on the semi-final heat races (Tours only). Italics - Fastest lap. * – Most laps led.  ^ – Most positions gained.

Elite 2
(key) Bold - Pole position awarded by fastest qualifying time (in Race 1) or by previous race's fastest lap (in Race 2) or by setting the fastest lap time on the semi-final heat races (Tours only). Italics - Fastest lap. * – Most laps led.  ^ – Most positions gained.

Team's Championship (Top 15)

See also

2018 Monster Energy NASCAR Cup Series
2018 NASCAR Xfinity Series
2018 NASCAR Camping World Truck Series
2018 NASCAR K&N Pro Series East
2018 NASCAR K&N Pro Series West
2018 NASCAR Whelen Modified Tour
2018 NASCAR Pinty's Series
2018 NASCAR PEAK Mexico Series

Notes

References

NASCAR Whelen Euro Series seasons
NASCAR Whelen Euro Series
2018 in NASCAR